Tim Davis may refer to:
 Tim Davis (activist) (born 1955), American cannabis activist
 Tim Davis (American football) (born 1958), American football player and coach
 Tim Davis (artist) (born 1969), American visual artist and poet
 Tim Davis (baseball) (born 1970), American baseball player
 Tim Davis (musician) (1943–1988), American drummer and singer-songwriter
 Tim Davis, candidate in the United States House of Representatives elections in Missouri, 2010
 Tim Davis, superintendent of Hillsboro City Schools, a school district in Hillsboro, Ohio, United States

See also
 Timothy Davis (disambiguation)
 Timothy Davies (disambiguation)